Pila Blanca is a ghost town in Duval County, Texas, located a mile and a half south of Highway 44 on Farm-to-Market Road 3196. It is ten miles southeast of Freer and twenty-five miles west of Alice. Today, there are a few residences and buildings remaining, but the precise population is unknown. A cemetery and an old water tower still exist in town.

References

Ghost towns in South Texas
Geography of Duval County, Texas